Noel Morris (born 1975) is an Irish hurler who played as a midfielder for the Tipperary senior team.

Morris joined the team during the 2000 championship and was a member of the team until he left the panel after the 2004 championship. He won National League, Munster and all-Ireland medals in 2001. Noel also won a minor Munster medal in 93 and Munster and all-Ireland u21 medals in 1995.

At club level Morris plays with the Loughmore–Castleiney club.

References

1975 births
Living people
Loughmore-Castleiney hurlers
Tipperary inter-county hurlers